Harry Ogwyn Jones (6 October 1922 – 20 March 1995) was a Welsh cricketer.  Jones was a right-handed batsman who bowled right-arm medium pace.  He was born at Llangennech, Carmarthenshire.

Jones played two first-class matches for Glamorgan against Essex and Worcestershire in the 1946 County Championship.

References

External links
Harry Jones at Cricinfo
Harry Jones at CricketArchive

1922 births
1995 deaths
Cricketers from Llanelli
Welsh cricketers
Glamorgan cricketers